Istog or Istok (Istok) or Burim is a town and municipality located in the District of Peja of western Kosovo. According to the 2011 census, the city of Istog has 5,115 inhabitants, while the municipality has 39,289 inhabitants. Based on the population estimates from the Kosovo Agency of Statistics in 2016, the municipality has 39,982 inhabitants.

Name 
The name of the town comes from the version of the Serbian word istok (variant istek), meaning "well, water source" referring to the springs of the Istočka river (literally "spring river"), a tributary to the White Drin river. The name of the nearby village of Vrela, one of the largest settlements in the municipality, also means "springs", as does the newly proposed Albanian name of the town, Burimi.

History
The Ottoman defter (tax registry; census) of 1582 registered the Ipek nahiyah as having 235 villages, of which Suho Grlo (Suvo Grlo) was located within modern Istog municipality. Suvo Grlo had three bigger mahala (neighbourhoods). One of the neighbourhoods included Muslim converts. There were several Orthodox priests in the village.

During World War II, a total of 140 Serbs were killed in 1941 and 1942 in the district of Istog and another 95 were killed in 1943 and 1944 by Albanian paramilitaries. The areas in and around Istog saw much resistance against the Yugoslav Partisans by Albanians in 1945. In Lipa, near Istog, Bajram Grobi and his group of 9 others were surrounded by a partisan battalion - they sustained 3 losses in total, including Bajram himself. In August, Sali Kama and Bik Pazari resisted the partisans in Bjeshka, near Istog. In March, Berlac Rogani and 7 other men were surrounded at a mountain in Binak, near Istog, by a battalion of partisans numbering to 650 Serbs and Montenegrins; after 36 hours of fighting, Rogani and his men killed 28 partisans and wounded 12 others. During the fighting, the partisans utilised women and children as human shields, but nonetheless, Rogani and his men managed to break the encirclement and all 8 fighters managed to survive despite their injuries. On the 10th of September, in Liçeva and Lesnika (also near Istog), 32 Albanians battled against 1,300 well-armed Montenegrins for 6 hours in an event known as the Battle of the 32 Heroes. Only 4 of the Albanians managed to survive despite being wounded. The commanders of the Albanian side were Shaban Sadiku, Adem Shala and Alush Smajli, with Smajli being the only one to survive with grave injuries, and the Montenegrins were from the Boka Kotorska brigade.

Demographics

According to the last official census done in 2011, the municipality of Istog has 39,289 inhabitants.

Ethnic groups
The municipality of Istog has an ethnic Kosovo Albanian majority. Most of the Kosovo Serbs live in the village of Osojane.
Osojane is to the east of the town of Istog; also part of the Serbs lives in northern part of the municipality.

The ethnic composition of the municipality:

Economy 
After World War II, watermills on the river of Istog were nationalized and a new fish plant was built to operate as a socially owned enterprise. The company's name under Yugoslavia was "Ribnjak", meaning "piscatory" or "fishery" in Serbian. It was later privatized as Motel "Trofta", meaning "trout" in Albanian - the type of fish it has and is still producing, selling, and distributing. The company employs around 70 people. The company acts as a hotel and restaurant, often hosting traditional weddings. The hotel provides hotel rooms as well as small bungalows by the river except Trofta Istog has the "burim" itself which everyone can go and visit the source of water and for sightseeing and the burim has the restaurants "Freskia" and "Morea" that are known for their food and the view of Istog.

Notable people 

 Fadil Ferati, Mayor of Istog from 1999 to 2010
 Fatmire Bajramaj, footballer
 Mergim Brahimi, footballer
 Besim Kabashi, kickboxer
 Abdul Qader Arnaout, Islamic scholar
 Azdren Llullaku, footballer
 Ibrahim Rugova, former President of Kosovo
 Adnan Januzaj, footballer
 Mërgim Mavraj, footballer
 Donis Avdiaj, footballer
 Selman Kadria, local hero known for the assassination of a Serbian military commander

See also 
 District of Peja
 Bosniaks in Kosovo
 KF Istogu

Notes and references 

Notes:

References:

External links

Municipality website 
Regional Archaeology in the Peja and Istog Districts of Kosova, archaeological project in the Istog region (University of Michigan)

 
Municipalities of Kosovo
Cities in Kosovo
Populated places in Peja District